Hanuš is a Czech name, which may be either a given name or a common family name.

First names
 Hanuš Schwaiger (1854–1912), Czech artist
 Hanuš Wihan (1855–1920), Czech cellist
 Jan Růže, also known as Master Hanuš, a Prague blacksmith apocryphally believed to have carried out the most important modification of the Prague astronomical clock
 Hanuš of Lipá (?-1415), was a Bohemian nobleman and landowner, married to Marketa of Sternberka. His name and story have been adapted into an NPC in the game Kingdom Come: Deliverance (2019).

Family names
 Jan Hanuš (composer) (1915–2004), Czech composer
 Jan Hanuš (footballer) (born 1988), Czech footballer for FK Jablonec
 Josef Hanuš (astronomer) (born 1983), a Czech planetary astronomer
 Josef Jan Hanuš (1911–1992), Czech fighter pilot
 Lumír Ondřej Hanuš (born 1947), Czech analytic chemist
 Miroslav Hanuš (born 1963), Czech actor

Other uses
 27986 Hanuš, an asteroid named after composer Jan Hanuš

See also
 66151 Josefhanuš, an asteroid named after the astronomer
 Hanus (disambiguation)
 Hanusch, a surname